Al Hasa is one of the districts  of Tafilah governorate, Jordan.

References 

 
Districts of Jordan